Manuel Pereira (born 18 June 1961) is a Spanish fencer. In 1989 he became the first Spaniard to earn a gold medal in épée in the World Fencing Championships. He also competed in the individual and team épée events at the 1988 and 1992 Summer Olympics.

Pereira became a coach after his retirement as a sportsman. Under his supervision, Spain won a gold medal in women's team épée at the 2004 World Fencing Championships in Lisbon. He was inducted in 2014 in the Hall of Fame of the Fédération Internationale d'Escrime. His son Yulen is a member of the Spanish épée team.

References

External links
 

1961 births
Living people
Spanish épée fencers
Spanish male épée fencers
Olympic fencers of Spain
Fencers at the 1988 Summer Olympics
Fencers at the 1992 Summer Olympics
Fencers from Madrid